The 2018 FIBA U16 European Championship Division C was the 14th edition of the Division C of the FIBA U16 European basketball championship. It was played in Serravalle, San Marino, from 3 to 11 July 2018. Ten teams participated in the competition. Andorra men's national under-16 basketball team won the tournament.

Participating teams

 (hosts)

Group phase

Group A

Group B

Playoffs

9th place match

5th–8th place playoffs

5th–8th place semifinals

7th place match

5th place match

Championship playoffs

Semifinals

3rd place match

Final

Final standings

References

External links
FIBA official website

FIBA U16 European Championship Division C
2018–19 in European basketball
2018 in Sammarinese sport
FIBA Europe Under-16 Championship
International basketball competitions hosted by San Marino
July 2018 sports events in Europe